A penumbral lunar eclipse will take place on December 20, 2048.

Visibility

Related lunar eclipses

Lunar year series

Metonic series (19 years)

Related lunar eclipses

Lunar year series

Half-Saros cycle
A lunar eclipse will be preceded and followed by solar eclipses by 9 years and 5.5 days (a half saros). This lunar eclipse is related to two total solar eclipses of Solar Saros 152.

See also 
List of lunar eclipses and List of 21st-century lunar eclipses

Notes

External links 
 

2048-12
2048-12
2048 in science